Famously Afraid is an American television series. The series premiered on Travel Channel on November 5, 2019. The show features celebrities who discuss their experiences with the paranormal.

Guests on the show include Howie Mandel, Hal Sparks, Chloe Lukasiak, Montel Williams, Richie Ramone, Geraldo Rivera, Kate Flannery, Brandi Glanville and Carson Kressley.

Other guests include Amber Rose, Chris Kattan, R.J. Mitte, Steve Guttenberg, Tori Spelling and Ed Lover as well as Todd Bridges, Patti Stanger, John Melendez, Parker Stevenson and Ty Pennington.

See also 
 Celebrity Ghost Stories

References

External links 
 

2019 American television series debuts
Travel Channel original programming
English-language television shows
Paranormal television